Hag is the twelfth studio album by Merle Haggard and The Strangers released on Capitol Records in 1971. It became his fifth album to top the Billboard country album charts. It also reached number 66 on the pop albums chart.

History
Hag was Haggard's first album with a majority of original songs in two years, following two tribute albums (to Jimmie Rodgers and Bob Wills) and two live albums in 1969 and 1970. While Hag spawned no #1 hits, it did include three singles that went to number 3.  In his 2013 book The Running Kind, Haggard biographer David Cantwell contends that Hag was "the most sustained and closest-to-coherent political statement of his career...The world Hag portrays on Hag is one teetering on the brink.  From atop some middle-American watchtower, Merle delivers a nearly despairing state of the union."  The album opens with the Ernest Tubb World War II era-hit  "Soldier's Last Letter," a song that took on a new relevance in 1971 with America's continued involvement in the Vietnam War.  Haggard addresses social issues plaguing the country at home,  such as street violence ("Jesus Take Hold") and homelessness ("Sidewalks of Chicago").  The LP also contains some of Haggard's most delicately sung love songs, such as the melancholy "Shelly's Winter Love" and "The Farmer's Daughter."  Haggard would rerecord "No Reason to Quit" for his 1983 duet album Pancho and Lefty with Willie Nelson.

Hag was reissued along with Let Me Tell You About a Song on CD by Beat Goes On Records in 2002.

Reception

Stephen Thomas Erlewine of AllMusic calls it "one of his absolute best albums—which means a lot, because he recorded no shortage of great records. In contrast to the rowdy live albums and the raucous Western swing that preceded it, Hag is quite quiet and reflective, sometimes referencing the turmoil within America at the end of the '60s, but more often finding Haggard turning inward." Music critic Robert Christgau wrote "Four country hits on Haggard's first straight studio album in a year and a half, but only the simple goodbye song "I Can't Be Myself" escapes bathos."

Track listing
All songs by Merle Haggard unless otherwise noted:

"Soldier's Last Letter" (Redd Stewart, Ernest Tubb) – 2:11
"Shelly's Winter Love" – 3:22
"Jesus, Take a Hold" – 2:16
"I Can't Be Myself" – 2:51
"I'm a Good Loser" – 2:38
"Sidewalks of Chicago" (Dave Kirby) – 2:29
"No Reason to Quit" (Dean Holloway) – 2:35
"If You've Got Time (To Say Goodbye)" – 2:52
"The Farmer's Daughter" – 2:55
"I've Done It All" – 2:15

Personnel
Merle Haggard– vocals, guitar

The Strangers:
Roy Nichols – lead guitar
Norman Hamlet – steel guitar, dobro
Bobby Wayne - rhythm guitar, harmony vocals
Dennis Hromek – bass, background vocals
Biff Adam – drums

with
Red Lane – guitar
George French – piano
Johnny Gimble – fiddle

and
Earl Ball – piano
Glen D. Hardin – piano

Chart positions

References

1971 albums
Merle Haggard albums
Capitol Records albums
Albums produced by Ken Nelson (United States record producer)

Albums recorded at Capitol Studios